Sharif Omer Abdalla Makki (born 9 June 1992), known as Sharif Omer, is a Sudanese professional footballer who plays as a midfielder for the Sudanese club Al-Ahli SC (Wad Madani), and the Sudan national team.

International career
Omer made his international debut with the Sudan national team in a 3–2 friendly loss to Ethiopia on 30 December 2021. He was part of the Sudan squad that was called up for the 2021 Africa Cup of Nations.

References

External links
 
 

1992 births
Living people
Sudanese footballers
Sudan international footballers
Association football midfielders
Sudan Premier League players
2021 Africa Cup of Nations players